Amaurobius hercegovinensis is a species of spider in the family Amaurobiidae, found in Bosnia-Hercegovina.

References

hercegovinensis
Spiders of Europe
Spiders described in 1915